Clifford Bernard Thompson (December 9, 1918 – February 6, 1997) was an American professional ice hockey player. He played defense in the Boston Bruins organization from 1939 until 1950, playing 16 career games in the National Hockey League with the Bruins during 1941–42 and 1948–49 seasons. The rest of his career was mainly spent in the minor Eastern Hockey League. After his playing career Thompsons became an linesman, and in 1955 was involved in an altercation with Maurice Richard, leading to Richard's suspension and the Richard Riot.

Playing career
Born in Winchester, Massachusetts, Thompson started his pro career with a tryout with the Boston Olympics in the 1938–39 season. He returned for two seasons with the Olympics, scoring 16 goals in 35 games in his rookie season. In 1941–42, he made his NHL debut with the Bruins, playing three games, while mainly playing for the Hershey Bears and St. Paul of the American Hockey Association (AHA). From 1942–1945, Thompson fought in World War II. He returned to the Olympics and played every season for the club until 1950, with a ten-game call-up to the Bruins in 1948–49 and nine games for the Bears that same season.

Career statistics

Regular season and playoffs

Awards and honours
 EAHL Second All-Star Team (1947, 1948)

References

External links
 

1918 births
1997 deaths
American men's ice hockey defensemen
American military personnel of World War II
Boston Bruins players
Boston Olympics players
Hershey Bears players
Ice hockey players from Massachusetts
National Hockey League officials
People from Winchester, Massachusetts
St. Paul Saints (AHA) players
Sportspeople from Middlesex County, Massachusetts